Richard Ryan Short (born December 6, 1972) is an American former professional baseball second baseman who was the co-Hitting coach for the Arizona Diamondbacks of Major League Baseball (MLB). He played in Major League Baseball (MLB) for the Washington Nationals and in Nippon Professional Baseball (NPB) for the Chiba Lotte Marines and the Tohoku Rakuten Golden Eagles. He bats and throws right-handed. He is an alumnus of Western Illinois University and Larkin High School in Elgin, IL.

Career

Playing career
Short was drafted in 1994 by the Baltimore Orioles in the 33rd round. He played eleven seasons in the minors and one in NPB before playing his first game in the MLB. While having an impressive offensive season for the AAA New Orleans Zephyrs, Short was called up to the MLB by the Washington Nationals after twelve years in the minors and made his MLB debut on June 10, collecting a pinch hit RBI in his first MLB at-bat. 

He was sent back to New Orleans the next day.  Short grabbed attention later in 2005, when he was hitting .400 for New Orleans with only 24 games left, resulting in the opportunity for him to become the first player to hit .400 in the Pacific Coast League since . However, Short did not break the record, finishing the season with a .383 average, he was promoted to the Nationals again in September. On September 7, Short hit his first major league home run against Dontrelle Willis of the Florida Marlins at RFK Stadium, 4 days later he hit his 2nd home run off of John Smoltz.  Short's season ended on September 23, when he suffered a shoulder injury. He ended the season with only 15 at-bats in 11 MLB games—and six hits giving him a .400 average.

After the 2005 season, Short's contract was sold to the Tohoku Rakuten Golden Eagles. He has hit over .300 in each season (2006, 2007, 2008) since his arrival, ranked not lower than third in three years, including one highest hit rate(.332) in 2008. Rick has shown versatility with the Golden Eagles playing first, second, and third base along with the outfield during the 2008 season.

Short has played in 1290 minor league games over 12 years and has a .317 career minor league average.

Coaching career
In February 2019, Short was named as the Hitting Coach for the AA Jackson Generals. On June 10, 2021, Short was promoted to be a co-hitting coach for the Arizona Diamondbacks following the firing of Darnell Coles and Eric Hinske.

References

External links

1972 births
Living people
American expatriate baseball players in Canada
American expatriate baseball players in Japan
Arizona Diamondbacks scouts
Baseball coaches from Illinois
Baseball players from Illinois
Bluefield Orioles players
Bowie Baysox players
Chiba Lotte Marines players
Edmonton Trappers players
Frederick Keys players
High Desert Mavericks players
Iowa Cubs players
Major League Baseball second basemen
Minor league baseball coaches
New Orleans Zephyrs players
Nippon Professional Baseball infielders
Nippon Professional Baseball outfielders
Omaha Royals players
Rochester Red Wings players
Salt Lake Stingers players
Sportspeople from Elgin, Illinois
Tohoku Rakuten Golden Eagles players
Washington Nationals players
West Tennessee Diamond Jaxx players
Western Illinois Leathernecks baseball players